Carabus finitimus is a bluish-coloured species of beetle in the family Carabidae. It is found in continental United States.

References

Further reading

finitimus
Beetles of North America
Beetles described in 1852